is a Japanese ice hockey player. He was team captain in the men's tournament at the 1998 Winter Olympics, and represented Japan in the World Championships fifteen times.

References

External links

1964 births
Living people
Japanese ice hockey players
Olympic ice hockey players of Japan
Ice hockey players at the 1998 Winter Olympics
Sportspeople from Hokkaido
Asian Games silver medalists for Japan
Medalists at the 1990 Asian Winter Games
Ice hockey players at the 1990 Asian Winter Games
Asian Games medalists in ice hockey